The Severe Letter or Letter of Tears was a letter written to the Corinthians by the Apostle Paul. It is mentioned in 2 Corinthians 2:4: "For out of much affliction and anguish of heart I wrote unto you with many tears; not that ye should be grieved, but that ye might know the love which I have more abundantly unto you." This description does not match First Corinthians, so there are two main theories on the Severe Letter:

The first theory is that the Severe Letter is lost.
The second theory is that the "Severe Letter" is preserved in 2 Corinthians 10–13. 

For more discussion on reconstructing Paul's correspondence with the Corinthians, see Second Epistle to the Corinthians.

References

Letters (message)
Lost religious texts
Pauline epistles
Christian terminology